"Should've Been a Cowboy" is a song written and recorded by American country music artist Toby Keith. It was released on February 12, 1993, as his debut single and the first from his self-titled debut album. On June 5, 1993, the song reached number one on the US Billboard Hot Country Songs and the Canadian RPM Country Tracks charts. It also peaked at number 93 on the Billboard Hot 100, making it a minor crossover hit.

It has received more than three million spins on country radio, making it the most-played country song of the 1990s.

The song is a staple following sporting events at Oklahoma State University (home of the Cowboys), often played over the venue's PA system several times in succession as fans emptied the stadium or arena.

American Aquarium covered the song on their 2021 album Slappers, Bangers, and Certified Twangers: Vol 1.

Content
The lyrics romanticize the cowboy lifestyle through references to old Westerns. The first verse references Gunsmoke, in which cowboy hero Marshall Dillon never settled down with love interest Miss Kitty. The second verse tells of his own adventures if the narrator were a cowboy: having "a sidekick with a funny name" (possibly a reference to sidekicks like Tonto or Gordito), travelling west to California (including the historical quote "Go West, young man"), hunting down Western outlaw Jesse James, joining up with the Texas Rangers, and so on. The chorus refers to famous singing cowboys Gene Autry and Roy Rogers, and lists common patterns depicted in Westerns such as six-shooters (revolvers) and cattle drives.

Response
In 2021, Adeem the Artist released the song "I Wish You Would've Been a Cowboy", an answer song to "Should've Been a Cowboy" which criticizes Keith.

Other media
The song is available as downloadable content on the music video game, Rock Band.

Chart positions
"Should've Been a Cowboy" debuted at number 69 on the Hot Country Songs chart for the week of March 6, 1993. It became Keith's first number one single on the chart dated June 5, 1993, remaining there for two weeks. It was certified Gold by the RIAA on November 28, 2012, almost twenty years after its release.

Year-end charts

Certifications

References

Songs about cowboys and cowgirls
1993 debut singles
1993 songs
Toby Keith songs
Songs written by Toby Keith
Song recordings produced by Harold Shedd
Mercury Records singles